Floyd Mayweather Jr. vs. Canelo Álvarez, billed as The One, was a boxing light middleweight championship superfight. The bout was held on September 14, 2013, in the MGM Grand Garden Arena, at the MGM Grand Hotel & Casino in Las Vegas, Nevada, United States, on Showtime PPV. The bout took place at a 152-pound catchweight, two pounds below the light middleweight limit of 154 pounds. Mayweather received $41.5 million for this fight before taking into account pay-per-view sales.

The fight was won by Mayweather in a 12-round majority decision in front of a sold out crowd of 16,746. Judge C. J. Ross scored the fight 114–114, a draw. Judge Dave Moretti had it 116–112, and Craig Metcalfe scored it 117–111. Ross retired after this fight, after the scorecards were roundly criticized for not reflecting how dominant Mayweather's performance was. Out of 86 media scorecards, all 86 scored the fight for Mayweather, with an average score of 119-109.

Fight card

International broadcasting

1The GMA News TV telecast ceased commercial operations due to high airtime cost with live coverage via satellite feed of Floyd Mayweather Jr. vs. Canelo Álvarez, part of GMA News TV ceased broadcasting operations due to the network's "disappointing" development. The GMA Network management announced that GMA News TV would sign-off on December 31, 2013, but the sign-off never materialized.

References

External links
 
 Floyd Mayweather Jr. vs. Canelo Álvarez Official Fight Card from BoxRec
 Floyd Mayweather Jr. vs. Canelo Álvarez on Showtime
 Golden Boy Promotions
 Mayweather Promotions

Boxing matches
Boxing matches involving Canelo Álvarez
Alvarez
2013 in boxing
Boxing in Las Vegas
Boxing on Showtime
2013 in sports in Nevada
Golden Boy Promotions
September 2013 sports events in the United States
MGM Grand Garden Arena